Heart Trouble may refer to:
"Heart Trouble" (The Parliaments song)
"Heart Trouble" (Steve Wariner song), from the album One Good Night Deserves Another
"Heart Trouble" (Martina McBride song), from the album The Way That I Am
Heart Trouble (album), a 2003 album by rockabilly singer Wanda Jackson
Heart Trouble (1928 film), an American silent comedy starring Harry Langdon